Human T-cell lymphotropic virus type 1 or human T-lymphotropic virus (HTLV-I), also called the adult T-cell lymphoma virus type 1, is a retrovirus of the human T-lymphotropic virus (HTLV) family that has been implicated in several kinds of diseases including very aggressive adult T-cell lymphoma (ATL), HTLV-I-associated myelopathy, uveitis, Strongyloides stercoralis hyper-infection and some other diseases. It is thought that about 1–5% of infected persons develop cancer as a result of the infection with HTLV-I over their lifetimes.

Adult T-cell lymphoma (ATL) was discovered in 1977 in Japan. The symptoms of ATL were different from other lymphomas known at the time. It was suggested that ATL is caused by the infection of a retrovirus called ATLV. Strikingly, ATLV had the transforming activity in vitro. These studies established that the retrovirus infection is the cause of ATL. The retrovirus is now generally called HTLV-I because later studies proved that ATLV is the same as the firstly identified human retrovirus called HTLV discovered by Bernard Poiesz and Francis Ruscetti and their co-workers in the laboratory of Robert C. Gallo at the National Cancer Institute. Infection with HTLV-I, like infection with other retroviruses, probably occurs for life.  A patient infected with HTLV can be diagnosed when antibodies against HTLV-1 are detected in the serum.

Virology
HTLV-1 is a retrovirus belonging to the family retroviridae and the genus deltaretrovirus. It has a positive-sense RNA genome that is reverse transcribed into DNA and then integrated into the cellular DNA. Once integrated, HTLV-1 continues to exist only as a provirus which can spread from cell to cell through a viral synapse. Few, if any, free virions are produced and there is usually no detectable virus in the blood plasma though the virus is present in genital secretions. Like HIV, HTLV-1 predominantly infects CD4+ T cells.

The viral RNA is packed into the icosahedral capsid which is contained inside the protein inner envelope. The lipid outer envelope is of host cell origin but contains viral transmembrane and surface proteins. The virion is spherical in shape with a diameter of about 100 nm.

Seven HTLV-1 genotypes are recognised—HTLV-1a through HTLV-1g. It is estimated that from 10 to 20 million people worldwide are infected; 3–8 million of them are in Africa. The most widespread genotype is type A. Types B, D, E, F and G have only been isolated from Central Africa. Type C is only present in Asia. Simian HTLV-1 genotypes are interspersed in between the human genotypes indicating frequent animal-human and human-animal transmission. The only human genotype that does not have a simian relative is A. It is thought that genotypes B, D, E, F and G originated in Africa from closely related STLV about 30,000 years ago, while the Asian genotype C is thought to have originated independently in Indonesia from the simians present there. Two subtypes are found in Japan: a transcontinental subgroup and a Japanese subgroup.

Epidemiology
The knowledge about HTLV-1 epidemiology is limited.

The highest prevalence for any country has been detected in Japan (particularly in the southwest); in 2007 around 1% of Japan's population was infected. Two studies of blood samples from 1988 and 2006-07 showed the highest number of carriers was found in people born from 1927 to 1937 (people age 8 to 18 in 1945). The reasons for this extremely high prevalence are not known.

In Taiwan, in Iran, and in Fujian (a Chinese province near Taiwan) the prevalence is 0.1–1%. The infection rate is about 1% in Papua New Guinea, the Solomon Islands, and Vanuatu, where the genotype C predominates. In Europe HTLV-1 is still uncommon, although it is present in some high-risk populations, including immigrants and intravenous drug users. In Americas the virus is found in indigenous populations and descendants of African ancestry from where it is thought to have originated. The general prevalence is from 0.1 to 1%. In Africa the prevalence is not well known, but it is about 1% in some countries.

HTLV-I infection in the United States appears to be about half as prevalent among IV drug users and about one-tenth as prevalent in the population at large as HIV infection. Although little serologic data exist, the prevalence of infection is thought to be highest among blacks living in the Southeast. A prevalence rate of 30% has been found among black intravenous drug users in New Jersey, and a rate of 49% has been found in a similar group in New Orleans.

HTLV-I infection in Australia is very high among the indigenous peoples of central and northern Australia, with a prevalence rate of 10–45%. HTLV-1 is believed to have been in Australia for 9,000 years, coming from a migration from Indonesia. In central Australia, around Alice Springs, an estimated 5,000 people are infected.

It is also high among the Inuit of Northern Canada, in Japan, northeastern Iran. Peru, the Pacific coast of Colombia and Ecuador, and the Caribbean.

Transmission
HTLV-1 has three main routes of transmission. Vertical transmission is most common, through which an infected mother transmits the virus to her child. Interestingly, the risk to a fetus while inside the womb is minimal, given the virtual absence of viral particles in human plasma. Most vertical infection occurs through breastfeeding. About 25% of infants who are breastfed by infected mothers are infected, while less than 5% of children born to but not breastfed by infected mothers are infected. Sexual transmission is second-most common, whereby an individual infects another through exchange of bodily fluids. Some evidence has suggested that male-to-female transmission is more efficient than female-to-male transmission. For example, one study in Japan found a 61% transmission rate for males to females vs. a less than 1% rate for females to males. Least common is parenteral transmission through blood transfusion, with an infection rate of 44-63% estimated in one study, and needle sharing among intravenous drug users. With proper prophylaxis (e.g. breastfeeding counseling for mothers, condom use, and donor blood screening), rates of transmission can be effectively reduced. The importance of the various routes of transmission is believed to vary geographically. The research in discordant couples showed that probability of sexual transmission is about 0.9 per 100 person-years.
 In Japan, the geographic clustering of infections suggest that the virus is more dependent on mother-to-child transmission.
 In the Caribbean, the geographic distribution of the virus is more uniform, and it is more common among those with many sexual partners, indicating that sexual transmission is more common.

Tropism

The term viral tropism refers to which cell types HTLV-I infects. Although HTLV-1 is primarily found in CD4+ T cells, other cell types in the peripheral blood of infected individuals have been found to contain HTLV-1, including CD8+ T cells, dendritic cells and B cells. HTLV-I entry is mediated through interaction of the surface unit of the virion envelope glycoprotein (SU) with its cellular receptor GLUT1, a glucose transporter, on target cells.

Associated diseases

Malignancies

Adult T cell leukemia/lymphoma

HTLV-1 is also associated with adult T-cell leukemia/lymphoma and has been quite well studied in Japan. The time between infection and onset of cancer also varies geographically. It is believed to be about sixty years in Japan and less than forty years in the Caribbean. The cancer is thought to be due to the pro-oncogenic effect of viral RNA incorporated into host lymphocyte DNA. Chronic stimulation of the lymphocytes at the cytokine level may play a role in the development of the malignancy. The lymphoma ranges from a very indolent and slowly progressive type to a very aggressive and nearly uniformly lethal proliferative type.

Cutaneous T-cell lymphoma
There is some evidence that HTLV-1 is a causative agent of cutaneous T-cell lymphoma.

Inflammatory diseases

HTLV myelopathy/tropical spastic paraparesis

HTLV-1 is also associated with a progressive demyelinating upper motor neuron disease known as HTLV-1 associated myelopathy/tropical spastic paraparesis (HAM/TSP), characterized by sensory and motor deficits, particularly of the lower extremities, incontinence and impotence. Only 0.3 to 4% of infected individuals develop HAM/TSP, but this will vary from one geographic location to another.

Signs and symptoms of HTLV myelopathy include:
 Motor and sensory changes in the extremities
 Spastic gait in combination with weakness of the lower limbs
 Clonus
 Bladder dysfunction(neurogenic bladder) and bladder cancer
Other neurologic findings that may be found in HTLV include:
 Mild cognitive impairment
 Erectile dysfunction

Arthropathy
HTLV-1 is associated with a rheumatoid-like arthropathy, although the evidence is contradictory. In these cases patients have a negative rheumatoid factor.

Uveitis
Studies from Japan demonstrated that HTLV-1 infection may be associated with an intermediate uveitis. At onset the patients present with blurred vision and floaters. The prognosis is favorable—the condition usually resolves within weeks.

Opportunistic infections
Individuals infected with HTLV-1 are at risk for opportunistic infections—diseases not caused by the virus itself, but by alterations in the host's immune functions.

HTLV-1, unlike the distantly related retrovirus HIV, has an immunostimulating effect which actually becomes immunosuppressive. The virus activates a subset of T-helper cells called Th1 cells. The result is a proliferation of Th1 cells and overproduction of Th1 related cytokines (mainly IFN-γ and TNF-α). Feedback mechanisms of these cytokines cause a suppression of the Th2 lymphocytes and a reduction of Th2 cytokine production (mainly IL-4, IL-5, IL-10 and IL-13). The result is a reduction in the ability of the infected host to mount an adequate immune response to invading organisms that require a predominantly Th2 dependent response (these include parasitic infections and production of mucosal and humoral antibodies).

In the central Australian Aboriginal population, HTLV-1 is thought to be related to their extremely high rate of death from sepsis. It is also particularly associated with bronchiectasis, a chronic lung condition predisposing to recurrent pneumonia. It is also associated with chronic infected dermatitis, often superinfected with Staphylococcus aureus and a severe form of Strongyloides stercoralis infection called hyper-infestation which may lead to death from polymicrobial sepsis. HTLV-1 infection has also been associated with Tuberculosis.

Treatment

Treatment of opportunistic infections varies depending on the type of disease and ranges from careful observation to aggressive chemotherapy and antiretroviral agents. Adult T cell lymphoma is a common complication of HTLV infection and requires aggressive chemotherapy, typically R-CHOP. Other treatments for ATL in HTLV infected patients include interferon alpha, zidovudine with interferon alpha and CHOP with arsenic trioxide. Treatments for HTLV myelopathy are even more limited and focus mainly on symptomatic therapy. Therapies studied include corticosteroids, plasmapheresis, cyclophosphamide, and interferon, which may produce a temporary symptomatic improvement in myelopathy symptoms.

Valproic acid has been studied to determine if it might slow the progression of HTLV disease by reducing viral load. Although in one human study it was effective in reducing viral load, there did not appear to be a clinical benefit. Recently however, a study of valproic acid combined with zidovudine showed a major decrease in the viral load of baboons infected with HTLV-1. It is important to monitor HTLV patients for opportunistic infections such as cytomegalovirus, histoplasmosis, scabies, pneumocystis pneumonia, and staphylococcal infections. HIV testing should also be performed, as some patients may be co-infected with both viruses.

Allogenic bone marrow transplantation has been investigated in the treatment of HTLV-1 disease with varied results. One case report describes an HTLV-1 infected woman who developed chronic refractory eczema, corneal injury and adult T cell leukemia. She was subsequently treated with allogenic stem cell transplantation and had complete resolution of symptoms. One year post-transplant, she has had no recurrence of any symptoms, and furthermore has had a decrease in her proviral load.

References

External links

 International Retrovirology Association
 

Deltaretroviruses
Infectious causes of cancer
Sexually transmitted diseases and infections